(romanized as .srb; abbreviation of /) is the Internationalised (Cyrillic) Internet country code top-level domain (IDN ccTLD) for Serbia. It has been active since May 3, 2011.

The Serbian National Internet Domain Registry (RNIDS) has initiated on its forum (www.forum.rnids.rs) a public discussion on the Proposal of rules and processes for registering the Cyrillic domain “”.

The Proposal of rules and processes for registering the Cyrillic domain “” is available on the forum of RNIDS. It regulates the registration of the sub-domain “” and the reservation of other domains for the needs of RNIDS, the reservation of the “” domain for the needs of the state, the reservation of the “” domain based on the current .rs domain names and the allocation of the unique code to each and every reserved “” domain.

The Rule book also determines the period for assigning the "" domain according to the priority right, after which the period of free registration of the "" domain will commence, based on the same or similar rules now applicable for the .rs domain.

The process of registering the Cyrillic domain "" had been expected to commence in the second half of 2011, but is postponed and it was started on 27 January 2012, due to some technical issues considering the documentation.

"" has, in many fonts, a very similar appearance to the Latin alphanumeric .cp6, which is not registered as a TLD. Similarly proposed TLDs .бг (for Bulgaria) and .ελ (for the Greece) have been rejected or stalled because of this problem, but "" has not. The general policy for internationalized TLDs is to require at least one of the letters in a TLD to not resemble a Latin letter; 6 is a numeric digit (not a Latin letter) and is not used in any TLDs. Furthermore, though б appears similar to a 6 in most Cyrillic alphabets, it does not in Serbian, where it more closely resembles Greek lowercase delta (δ), see the relevant section in the article on the letter .

See also 
 .rs, a Latin top-level domain for Serbia.
 .бг
 .қаз
 .мкд
 .рф
 .укр
 .бел

References

External links
Serbian National Internet Domain Registry (RNIDS)

срб
Internet in Serbia
Council of European National Top Level Domain Registries members